Álvaro de Figueroa y Torres-Sotomayor, 1st Count of Romanones (9 August 1863 – 11 October 1950) was a Spanish politician and businessman. He served as Prime Minister three times between 1912 and 1918, president of the Senate, president of the Congress of Deputies, Mayor of Madrid and many times as cabinet minister. He belonged to the Liberal Party. Romanones, who built an extensive political network, exerted a tight control on the political life of the province of Guadalajara during much of the Restoration period. He also was a prolific writer, authoring a number of history essays.

Biography

Early life
Born on 15 August 1863 in the Casa de Cisneros, at the Madrid's Plaza de la Villa, he was son of Ignacio Figueroa y Mendieta (a millionaire who had inherited a fortune from the mining companies of his father) and Ana de Torres y Romo (an aristocrat, daughter of the Marquis of Villamejor).

When he was a child, he suffered a barouche accident that broke his right leg and caused a limp for the rest of his life. His disability would come to be mocked on a regular basis in cuplés, jokes and caricatures.

He earned a licentiate degree in Law from the Central University of Madrid in 1884. He moved in February 1885 to the University of Bologna's Collegio di Spagna, where he remained until December 1885, earning a doctorate in jurisprudence by reading a dissertation titled Introduzione allo studio del diritto costituzionale. He never practiced law, though.

Politics in Restoration Spain 

In 1888, he became member of the Congress of Deputies in representation of Guadalajara for the first time, elected in a by-election to cover a vacant seat. Short by a few months of turning the 25 years of age needed to become a legislator, he reportedly hid this circumstance.

He participated in a parliamentary scandal in July 1889, when amid a tense squabble in the legislature, he wielded his walking stick against , who had reportedly approached the Marquis of Vega de Armijo displaying an aggressive attitude. He was falsely accused by Romero Robledo of "having drawn the rapier he had hidden in his cane".

He was elected Madrid municipal councillor in 1889. After serving as responsible for the districts of Buenavista and Audiencia, as patron of the School of San Ildefonso, and as director of the Services of Abattoirs, Markets and Thoroughfares and Works, Figueroa renounced to the office in 1892.

He delivered an ignominious tirade against the Mayor of Madrid  from his parliamentary seat in 1892, so much that the offended called for a duel, which was held on 10 July 1892 in Leganés. The combatants crossed two shots.

In 1894 he was appointed as Mayor of Madrid. In 1896 he acquired a daily newspaper, El Globo, based in Madrid, appointing Francos Rodríguez as editor and tilting the editorial line from republicanism to liberal monarchism. 

He served as Minister of Public Instruction and Fine Arts (1901–1902) in the government of Sagasta. In 1901, he incorporated primary education teachers' salaries (hitherto dependent on the local administrations) in the State budget, securing the teachers economic autonomy and curbing the influence of caciquismo in education. In 1903 he founded a new political newspaper, replacing El Globo, which had been sold to Emilio Rius y Periquet.

In the Liberal governments of 1905 and 1906 he was Minister of Development (Fomento which included agriculture, industry, commerce and public works), Justice and Interior. He contributed to the rise of José Canalejas to the top of the Liberal Party and, as a reward, he was appointed minister of public instruction in 1909 and later propmoted to the presidency of the House of Representatives (Congreso de los Diputados) in 1912.

After the assassination of Canalejas, he became one of the prominent figures in the Liberal Party and he was appointed prime minister (1912–1913). He negotiated with France a treaty on Morocco.

During the First World War he held a pro-French stance, which put him in conflict with the official declaration of neutrality of the government of Eduardo Dato and with the pro-German stance of the conservatives.  When he again became prime minister (1915–1917), he changed Spain's foreign policy closer to the allies and confronting Germany over an incident of Spanish ships being torpedoed by German submarines  Incapable of resolving Spain's social problems and attacked by the pro-German conservative press, he finally resigned.

Shortly after he participated in the coalition government of Antonio Maura as Minister of Instruction and of Justice and in the government of Manuel García Prieto as Minister of State (1918), and he presided a brief government in December 1918, which was toppled by the autonomist agitation in Catalonia and the labour conflicts. He was replaced in April 1919 after issuing the Eight Hour Workday Decree.

He was minister of justice (1922–1923) in the liberal government of Manuel García Prieto and became president of the Senate in 1923, serving in such capacity when the military coup of Miguel Primo de Rivera took place on 13 September 1923.

During the dictatorship of Primo de Rivera, he stayed out of politics although he participated in the conspiracy known as the Sanjuanada for which he was fined.

He was appointed Minister of State in the government of Juan Bautista Aznar Cabañas, but the elections in 1931 showed that the monarchy was unpopular so he advised Alfonso XIII to leave Spain.

Romanones talked personally to Niceto Alcalá Zamora and his revolutionary committee and agreed to the peaceful transfer of power to the Provisional Republican Government, without military intervention, in exchange of the guarantee for the life of the royal family.

Later life

During the Second Republic, he remained deputy representative for Guadalajara.

The outbreak of the Civil War found him in San Sebastián in charge of his own business, and he crossed over to France with the help of the French ambassador. He moved to the Nationalist zone in 1937, and, having become an ardent supporter of Francisco Franco, he was one of the signatories of the Advisory Opinion on the Illegitimacy of the Acting Powers on the 18th of July 1936, an ad-hoc juridical report commissioned by the Francoist Government in Burgos, trying to legitimate the "national uprising"—the 1936 coup d'etat—by means of twisted arguments such as imputing on those assaulted the very crime that the assault entailed, that of "aiding of the rebellion".

After the war he wrote his memoirs and was president of the Real Academia de Bellas Artes de San Fernando and member of the academies of History and Jurisprudence.

He died on 11 September 1950 in Madrid.

Works and views 
Romanones was a prolific writer and he wrote his memoirs during the Second Republic. He wrote several biographies as well as political works and essays.

Although Catholic, he was against religious intolerance and also against the influence of the clergy for which he often clashed with religious authorities.  An example of this happened with the enactment of the Civil Marriage Law of 1905 which stated that those getting married did not have to declare their religion.  He reinstated diplomatic relations with the Holy See but he was a fervent supporter of the separation of Church and State.

Honours
He was a Doctor of Law by the University of Bologna, a member of the Royal Academy of History and of the Royal Academy of Moral and Political Sciences. Director of the Real Academia de Bellas Artes de San Fernando and a president of the Ateneo Madrileño.

He was made Count of Romanones in 1893 and Grandee of Spain in 1911, as well as 7th Count of Yebes in 1922.

References
Informational notes

Citations

Bibliography
 
 
 
 
 
 
 
 
 

This article is based on the article in the Spanish Wikipedia.

1863 births
1950 deaths
Politicians from Madrid
Counts of Spain
Grandees of Spain
Liberal Party (Spain, 1880) politicians
Spanish monarchists
Prime Ministers of Spain
Foreign ministers of Spain
Francoists
Presidents of the Congress of Deputies (Spain)
Members of the Congress of Deputies of the Spanish Restoration
Members of the Senate of Spain
Members of the Congress of Deputies of the Second Spanish Republic
Members of the Cortes Españolas
Leaders of political parties in Spain
Spanish people of the Spanish Civil War (National faction)
Interior ministers of Spain
Presidents of the Senate of Spain
Presidents of the Ateneo de Madrid
Mayors of Madrid
Madrid city councillors